The Abercrombie Caves, contained within the Abercrombie Karst Conservation Reserve, are a series of limestone arch caves that are located in the Central West region of New South Wales, Australia. The caves are renowned for their karst qualities, namely the formation that has been eroded by water action that has developed from a sinkhole to become a blind valley. Several good examples of crayback formations exist in both entrances.

The caves are registered as a natural heritage site on the Register of the National Estate for its large diversity of karst morphological and sedimentological features. Camping in the reserve is permitted, with sixty campground sites and two cottages. The caves are open seven days a week during school holidays; and closed on Monday and Tuesday during school terms.

Features
The most popular feature of the Abercrombie Caves is The Archway the largest natural arch in the southern hemisphere. Within The Archway cave is the gold miners dance platform built in January 1880 by gold miners, replacing a platform built in the 1860s, the 1880s platform is still used for performances to this day including the annual Carols in the Caves performance.

Other caves within the reserve are King Solomon's Temple, Cathedral Cave, Grove Cave, and the Bushranger's Cave.

History
It is believed that a tourist party visited the caves in 1834 but the Caves were not 'officially' discovered until 1842 by Surveyor W. R. Davidson. Surveyor Wells discovered the Koh-i-noor, Bushranger, Long Tunnel, and Cathedral caves and the Hall of Terpsichore (The Dance Hall) in 1843. Explorer William Wentworth and Governor Charles Fitzroy visited Abercrombie Caves in 1844.

It is believed that various bushrangers used the caves as a hideout during the 1800s. The earliest known is the Ribbon Gang who used the caves in 1830.

Gold was discovered in the area in 1854. A gold exploration community was established at Mount Gray, just above the caves. Miners from many of the surrounding communities would often visit the caves for recreation.

The caves were originally known as Burragylong Caverns and during the mining period they became known as Abercrombie caves.

Vandalism occurred in the early days when many pieces of white marble were carted away by the visitors as souvenirs and the miners damaged many of the formations by firing rifles at them. Some graffiti name carvings can still be seen inside the caves from the 19th century period.

See also

 List of caves in New South Wales
 Protected areas of New South Wales

References

External links
 Abercrombie Caves at nationalparks.nsw.gov.au

Nature reserves in New South Wales
Show caves in Australia
Limestone caves
Central West (New South Wales)
Protected areas established in 1997
1997 establishments in Australia
Caves of New South Wales